This is a list of governors of the United Provinces and the precursor offices associated with that title from the provisional establishment of the Governor of Agra in 1833 until the province was renamed as Uttar Pradesh when India became officially a republic in 1950.

Governors of the United Provinces (1937–1947) 
 Sir Harry Graham Haig, 1 April 1937 – 7 December 1939, continued
Nawab of Chhatari, acting Governor, April to November 1937
 Sir Maurice Garnier Hallett, 7 December 1939 – 7 December 1945
 Sir Francis Verner Wylie, 7 December 1945 – 14 August 1947

Governors of the United Provinces of Independent India (1947-1950)
On 15 August 1947 India achieved independence from the United Kingdom.  
 Sarojini Naidu, 15 August 1947 – 2 March 1949
 Bidhu Bhushan Malik, 3 March 1949 – 1 May 1949 acting
 Hormasji Peroshaw Mody, 2 May 1949 – 25 January 1950

The province was renamed Uttar Pradesh on 26 January 1950, headed by the Governor of Uttar Pradesh.

See also 
 (1732–1857) - Nawabs of Awadh
 (1834–1836) - Governors of Agra
 (1836–1877) - Lieutenant Governors of the North-Western Provinces
 (1856–1877) - Chief Commissioners of Oudh
 (1877–1902) - Lieutenant Governors of the North-Western Provinces and Chief Commissioners of Oudh
 (1902–1921) - Lieutenant Governors of the United Provinces of Agra and Oudh
 (1921–1937) - Governors of the United Provinces of British India
 (1937–1950) - Governors of the United Provinces
 (1950 – cont.) - Governors of Uttar Pradesh

References 

 Provinces of British India
 The India List and India Office List By India Office, Great Britain

British administration in Uttar Pradesh
Governors